Candace Cable (born July 15, 1954) is a nine-time Paralympian. She was the first woman to medal in the Summer and Winter Paralympic Games. Cable is also a six-time winner of the Boston Marathon, women's wheelchair division and winner of the first four Los Angeles Marathons.

Biography
Cable was born in Glendale, California. She moved to South Lake Tahoe/Truckee, California after high school, lying about her age to get a job in a casino.  She was injured in a car accident on the Kingsbury Grade in 1975 at the age of 21. Following the accident, without the use of her legs, she began feeling sorry for herself and became addicted to heroin.  At the time she said “A person in a wheelchair is not supposed to have fun or be happy. I’m both. Besides, I get the best parking spaces at shopping centers, and I don’t have to wait in line at the movies.”  She went through drug rehabilitation in 1978.  She became acquainted with wheelchair sports while attending California State University, Long Beach first trying swimming before finding wheelchair racing could let her work out with able-bodied friends.

After four months of training, Cable participated in the inaugural 1980 World Games for the disabled, 1984 Summer Olympics in wheelchair racing as an exhibition event, as well as the 1984, 1988, 1992, and 1996 Summer Paralympic Games, and also five Winter Olympics. Cable won twelve Paralympic medals of which eight were gold medals. She was the first woman to medal in the Summer and Winter Paralympic Games.

References

External links 
 
 
 

1954 births
Living people
Boston Marathon female winners
California State University, Long Beach alumni
American disability rights activists
Paralympic gold medalists for the United States
People with paraplegia
Medalists at the 1980 Summer Paralympics
Medalists at the 1992 Summer Paralympics
Medalists at the 1992 Winter Paralympics
Paralympic medalists in athletics (track and field)
Paralympic medalists in alpine skiing
Alpine skiers at the 1992 Winter Paralympics
Athletes (track and field) at the 1980 Summer Paralympics
Athletes (track and field) at the 1992 Summer Paralympics
Paralympic track and field athletes of the United States
Paralympic alpine skiers of the United States
American female wheelchair racers
21st-century American women
20th-century American women